Blåsmark is a locality situated in Piteå Municipality, Norrbotten County, Sweden with 339 inhabitants in 2010.

References 

Populated places in Piteå Municipality
Norrbotten